Chalcorana megalonesa is a species of true frog in the family Ranidae, the "true frogs". It is endemic to Borneo and is known from both Malaysia (Sarawak, Sabah) and Indonesia (Kalimantan). It was split off from Rana chalconota (now Chalcorana chalconota) in 2009 by Robert Inger and colleagues, along with a number of other species. Common name large white-lipped frog has been coined for it.

Description
Chalcorana megalonesa are moderately large-sized frogs: adult males measure  and females  in snout–vent length. Body is moderately slender and legs are long. Dorsum is weakly granular. Colouration is mostly green. The snout is long and pointed. Finger and toe tips have adhesive disks. It is very similar to Chalcorana raniceps in colouration and general body shape but is clearly bigger in size.

Habitat
Breeding takes place in small, permanent ponds (usually >30 cm deep). It can also be found in oil palm and forest concessions and appears to tolerate habitat disturbance. However, the use of pesticides and herbicides on palm oil plantations is a threat to it. It occurs in a number of protected areas.

References

megalonesa
Endemic fauna of Borneo
Amphibians of Indonesia
Amphibians of Malaysia
Amphibians described in 2009
Taxa named by Robert F. Inger
Amphibians of Borneo